Jonathan do Nascimento do Paraizo Mendes (born 14 April 1990) is a Brazilian hurdler. He competed in the 110 metres hurdles event at the 2015 World Championships in Beijing without qualifying for the semifinals. His personal bests are 13.53 seconds in the 110 metres hurdles (+0.4 m/s, São Paulo 2014) and 7.82 seconds in the 60 metres hurdles (São Caetano do Sul 2014).

Competition record

References

External links

1990 births
Living people
Brazilian male hurdlers
World Athletics Championships athletes for Brazil
Athletes from Rio de Janeiro (city)
Athletes (track and field) at the 2015 Pan American Games
South American Games silver medalists for Brazil
South American Games medalists in athletics
Competitors at the 2014 South American Games
Pan American Games athletes for Brazil
20th-century Brazilian people
21st-century Brazilian people